G-III Apparel Group is an American clothing company which designs, manufactures, and markets women's and men's apparel in the United States and internationally through a portfolio of highly recognizable proprietary and licensed brand names, including Guess?, DKNY, Calvin Klein, Tommy Hilfiger, Andrew Marc, Levi Strauss & Co., Dockers, Harley-Davidson apparel, Kenneth Cole and Wilsons.

History 
Aron Goldfarb (1924–2012), a Polish-born Holocaust survivor, founded the company as an outerwear brand, G&N Sportswear, in 1956, and in 1972 his son, Morris Goldfarb, current chief executive officer, joined the company. Now called the G-III Apparel Group, the company has become a leading manufacturer and distributor of apparel and accessories under both owned and licensed brands as well as private label brands.

Brands 
The company has more than 30 brands including outerwear, footwear, dresses, sportswear, swimwear, ready-to-wear, and women's performance wear.

G-III's owned brands include Donna Karan, DKNY, Vilebrequin, Eliza J., Andrew Marc, Marc New York, Bass, and Jessica Howard.

G-III has fashion licenses under the Calvin Klein, Tommy Hilfiger, Karl Lagerfeld, Kenneth Cole, Cole Haan, Guess?, Vince Camuto, Ivanka Trump, Kensie, Jessica Simpson, Levi's and Dockers brands.

Through its team sports business, G-III has licenses with the NFL, NBA, MLB, NHL, Hands High, Touch by Alyssa Milano and more than 100 U.S. colleges and universities.

G-III also operates retail stores under the DKNY, Wilsons Leather, Bass, Vilebrequin and Calvin Klein Performance names.

Ready-to-wear and dresses

Swimwear

Handbags and luggage

Outerwear

Retail

Accessories

Footwear

Casual, active and performance

Team sports

Welfare concerns

Some of G-III's brands, such as Andrew Marc and Ivanka Trump, have been accused of flouting serious animal or human welfare principles.

See also
 Andrew Marc#Dog fur controversy
 Seam Apparel

References

External links
 

Clothing companies based in New York City
Publicly traded companies based in New York City
Companies listed on the Nasdaq